Rolleston College is the only secondary school in the town of Rolleston, New Zealand. The school is described as a future-focused and inclusive co-educational state high school. The school is one of the largest secondary schools in the South Island having a roll of 1,435 as of 1 July 2022.

History 
Construction on the school began in July 2015, and was completed in January 2017.

Rolleston College was opened on 30 January 2017, and was initially open only to Year 9 students in the first year of secondary school. The school added year levels annually as the 2017 Year 9 cohort moved through; the school opened to all year levels (Years 9 to 13) in January 2021.

At the time of opening, Rolleston College was the first state high school to open in Canterbury in more than 30 years. Prior to Rolleston College's opening, the nearest secondary school to Rolleston was Lincoln High School in the town of Lincoln.

Staff 
The school consists of approximately 150 teachers, and 200 total staff. The principal is Rachel Skelton who replaced the first principal Steve Saville in 2020 after he stepped down in December 2019.

Future expansions 
The school plans to create a second campus, as the original campus was not designed to cater for upwards of 1,500 students. The second campus is planned to house senior students, while the original campus would be exclusively for juniors The second campus is expected to open in 2025.

There has been some criticism of this decision, with some critics saying that opting to create a second secondary school in Rolleston would have been the more favorable decision.

Then-Minister of Education Chris Hipkins said at the end of 2021, when making the land purchase announcement, that the expansion would take the college’s capacity to about 3400 students. If the school reaches or exceeds its future capacity, that would make Rolleston College the largest school in New Zealand, beating out Rangitoto College in Auckland, which has around 3200 students.

References 

Secondary schools in Canterbury, New Zealand
Rolleston, New Zealand